Ratšoleli is a community council located in the Qacha's Nek District of Lesotho. Its population in 2006 was 6,633.

Villages
The community of Ratšoleli includes the villages of Foreisetata, Ha Makhaola, Ha Matlali, Ha Moloko, Ha Mosuoe, Ha Rafatše, Ha Ratšoleli, Ha Rooijane, Ha Thaba, Ha Tšepiso, Kanana, Lehafing (Ha Matlali), Lekhalong, Likhohloaneng, Linokong, Mafikeng, Mankoaneng, Matebeng, Matsoetlane (Motalaneng), Pitseng, Sethebeng and Waterfall.

References

External links
 Google map of community villages

Populated places in Qacha's Nek District